This list includes high-ranking commanders who took part in the Turkish War of Independence:

See also 
 Turkish State Cemetery#Burials
 List of recipients of the Medal of Independence with Red-Green Ribbon (Turkey)

Footnotes

References 
 T.C. Genelkurmay Harp Tarihi Başkanlığı Yayınları, Türk İstiklâl Harbine Katılan Tümen ve Daha Üst Kademelerdeki Komutanların Biyografileri, Genkurmay Başkanlığı Basımevi, Ankara, 1972. 

Turkish military personnel of the Turkish War of Independence
Lists of Turkish military personnel